The 2007 Africa Cup was the eighth edition of highest level rugby union tournament in Africa. The competition involved twelve teams that were divided into two zones (North and South). Each zone was then divided into two pools of three. Each pool winner then qualified for a semi-final; the semi-final winners then played each other in the final.

Nations
The teams competing were:

 
 
 
 
 
 

 
 °
 
 
 
 

°South Africa sent only amateur players.

Division 1 (Africa Cup)

Pool stage
Pool winners qualify for the semi-finals.

Bonus point system: 4 points for a win, 2 for a draw, 0 for a loss, 1 point for scoring four tries in a game, 1 point for losing by seven or less.

North Pool Group A

North Pool Group B

South Pool Group A

South Pool Group B

Knockout stage
Played in Antananarivo, Madagascar.

Semi-finals

Third place play-off

Final

Division 2

External links
Madagascar: Rugby - Can 2007, les Makis à un pas du bonheur - allafrica.com

2007
2007 rugby union tournaments for national teams
2007 in African rugby union